The 1926 Memorial Cup final was the eighth junior ice hockey championship of the Canadian Amateur Hockey Association. The George Richardson Memorial Trophy champions Queen's University of Eastern Canada competed against the Abbott Cup champions Calgary Canadians of the Calgary City Junior Hockey League in Western Canada. The Queen's University team was a junior squad which played exhibition games against teams in the Ontario Hockey Association senior division, and teams in the Lake Ontario Veteran's Hockey League. In a best-of-three series, held at Shea's Amphitheatre in Winnipeg, Manitoba, Calgary won their 1st Memorial Cup, defeating Queen's University two games to one.

Scores
Game 1: Calgary 4-2 Queen's
Game 2: Queen's 3-2 Calgary
Game 3: Calgary 3-2 Queen's

Winning roster
Chuck Dunn, Irving Frew, Ronnie Martin, Joe McGoldrich, Don McFadyen, George McTeer, Tony Savage, Bert Taylor, Paul Thompson, Sam Timmins.   Coach: Eddie Poulin

References

External links
 Memorial Cup
 Canadian Hockey League

Memorial Cup tournaments
Ice hockey in Winnipeg
Mem